Robert Roy (born 7 October 1948) is a New Zealand former cricketer. He played four first-class matches for Otago between 1970 and 1972.

See also
 List of Otago representative cricketers

References

External links
 

1948 births
Living people
New Zealand cricketers
Otago cricketers
People from Gore, New Zealand